Grylloblatta washoa is a species of insect in the family Grylloblattidae. Its type locality is Echo Summit in the Sierra Nevada of California, United States. Specimens have also been collected in Placer County and Nevada County.

References

Grylloblattidae
Insects of the United States
Insects described in 1961